The White Rabbit (Dr. Lorina Dodson) is a supervillainess appearing in American comic books published by Marvel Comics. The character has been depicted as an enemy of Spider-Man.

Publication history

She first appeared in Marvel Team-Up #131 in July 1983, and was created by J.M. DeMatteis, Kerry Gammill, and Mike Esposito.

Fictional character biography
Born to a wealthy family, Lorina Dodson who would become the White Rabbit grew up in a safe, secure environment and was showered with all the material possessions she ever wanted. However, she was bored, and only found entertainment from classic literature, such as Alice in Wonderland. As she grew older, her family married her off to an older gentleman named Lewis Dodson (a name derived from the author of the Alice in Wonderland books, Lewis Carroll, whose real name was Charles Dodgson). At the time of the marriage, she was twenty-five and he was eighty-two. She resented being treated as a trophy wife, so she killed her husband, and the police thought it was an accident.

After that, she would only mention that he "died happy", and subsequently used her inheritance to buy various gadgets so that she could experience a life full of danger and excitement. She became the White Rabbit, an eccentric criminal, whose costume resembled a cross between the literary character from Alice in Wonderland and a Playboy Bunny. While the White Rabbit is clearly insane to the point of being completely ridiculous, she is quite articulate and has a great knowledge of literature. At some point early in her career she was trying to establish her reputation and confronted Deadpool, who was bonded with the Venom symbiote. She used an array of carrot bombs and mutant rabbits, as well as stealing only watches. She spent her first days as a criminal robbing various fast food joints, most notably "Kwikkee Burger". She and her gang were eventually confronted by Frog-Man (a frequent customer at Kwikkee Burger), who was able to defeat her hired help only with Spider-Man's aid. The White Rabbit escaped, but struck later at a book fair, where she found the two superheroes once again. The White Rabbit, witnessing her men getting defeated, fled using her jet-boots, but they began to malfunction, allowing Frog-Man to knock her into a building.

Much later, she resurfaced, plotting to get her revenge on Frog-Man. She allied herself with the Walrus, but they were defeated by Spider-Man, Frog-Man, and Frog-Man's father, Leap-Frog. Ditching the Walrus, she popped up again later with two new villains, Mad Hatter and Dormouse, though they were both actually hired actors, as no other supervillains would work with the White Rabbit. She formed a new plan by capturing Grizzly and Gibbon and ransoming them for one billion dollars in gold. She also created several genetically-altered rabbits, who were ready to eat Grizzly and Gibbon. The Mayor, however, only offered the White Rabbit $2.50, which caused her to fly into a rage and raise the ransom to five billion dollars (this time the Rabbit demanded that the ransom be paid entirely in quarters), but Spider-Man, under the alias of the Bombastic Bag-Man - as he was currently wanted for murder as Spider-Man thanks to the machinations of Norman Osborn, he was forced to use an alternative costume and lacked the time to get any of his other new costumes infiltrated the White Rabbit's hideout and battled her giant rabbit robot. She was then knocked out by Grizzly (who claimed he did it so he would not be accused of being sexist). He and his partner had escaped, remembering Gibbon's natural affinity with the Animal Kingdom and thus taming the GM Rabbits.

White Rabbit was later seen at an auction in which the Venom Symbiote and Scorpion suit was sold. She tried to rob another bank, but was interrupted by Grizzly. However, she escaped and the police arrested Grizzly by mistake.

In the limited series Claws, the White Rabbit, her outfit modified (now more than ever resembling a Playboy Bunny), became romantically involved with Arcade, a man with a dedication for drama and who controls 'Murderworlds', where people are killed off in carnivalesque ways. They go after Wolverine and the Black Cat. The two heroes manage to defeat Arcade and the White Rabbit. They are dropped off in the Savage Land, a prehistoric land hidden deep in the Antarctic. The White Rabbit became queen of a group of tribal warriors.

During the Dark Reign storyline, White Rabbit appears as a member of the Hood's gang. She is part of a sub-group of said gang that attacks Mister Negative. The motive is because he will not hand over his control of the criminal underworld in New York's 'Chinatown'.

White Rabbit is next seen in Los Angeles, where she is working as a drug dealer to the rich and famous. One of her clients is Bobby Carr, Mary Jane's boyfriend. Carr is also an actor and is using Mutant Growth Hormone to bulk up for a movie role. The Rabbit turned on her client when the U.S. Department of Justice wanted him to inform them who his dealer is. White Rabbit and her gang attacked Carr and MJ at a trendy Los Angeles club, gassing the party goers. Mary Jane rescued Carr and took out White Rabbit at the club, when the police arrived and took the White Rabbit into custody.

During the Spider-Island storyline, White Rabbit (alongside Chance and Scorcher) attacks Peter Parker and Carlie Cooper at an abandoned lab that the Jackal is in at Empire State University. She ends up knocked down by Peter using the moves learned from Shang-Chi.

During the Dying Wish arc, White Rabbit later makes a cameo at the Raft at the time when Hydro-Man, Scorpion, and Trapster spring Doctor Octopus (whose mind has been swapped with Peter's mind) out of the Raft.

White Rabbit was then seen trying to rob a truck with two goons but when the Superior Spider-Man (Otto Octavius's mind in Spider-Man's body) arrived they quickly surrendered, as they did not wanted to be beaten in the same way he previously did to both Boomerang and Vulture.

White Rabbit later appeared as a member of the Menagerie (which also consisted of Hippo, Skein, and a new villain called Panda-Mania). They were on a rampage stealing expensive eggs from an auction. White Rabbit named the group the Menagerie because of the villains' animal themes, even though Skein did not use the Gypsy Moth name. She and the Menagerie are defeated by Spider-Man despite the fact that Skein used her powers to destroy Spider-Man's outfit. White Rabbit and the rest of the Menagerie later reunite to commit a diamond heist, which led to another defeat at Spider-Man's hands.

White Rabbit next hires Howard the Duck to procure Pym Particles for her, but the plan is foiled by Ant-Man. She later participates in a gang war, battling the Spot in the Third Precinct.

As part of the All-New, All-Different Marvel event, White Rabbit allies with Walrus and the new Goldbug for a plan that involves tampering with New York City's drinking water. The three villains are located and defeated by Spider-Woman, and are taken to the refurbished Ryker's Island, now called the Cellar.

White Rabbit later appeared as a member of the Hateful Hexad alongside Bearboarguy, Gibbon, Ox, Squid, and Swarm. During the Hateful Hexad's disastrous fight against Spider-Man and Deadpool, the battle is crashed by Itsy Bitsy, who brutally murders most of the villains, traumatizing White Rabbit who was saved by Deadpool.

In a prelude to the Hunted storyline, White Rabbit is among the animal-themed characters captured by Taskmaster and Black Ant for Kraven the Hunter's upcoming Great Hunt. She watched the fight between Spider-Man and Scorpion until the Hunter-Bots arrive. White Rabbit then fled from the Hunter-Bots. When Vulture gathers the animal-themed characters together, White Rabbit was present when Spider-Man informs them about the loss of Gibbon and Mandrill while Toad mentions the loss of Man-Bull. Serving as bait, White Rabbit lured the Hunter-Bots towards the Savage Six and the other animal-themed characters where the Hunter-Bots were attacked by them. White Rabbit even fought against the Hunter-Bots. When Kraven the Hunter has Arcade lower the forcefield around Central Park, White Rabbit is among the animal-themed characters that are freed. White Rabbit then joined Human Fly, Razorback, Toad, and Yellowjack in a plan to deliver payback to the captive Black Ant only for Taskmaster to rescue Black Ant.

White Rabbit appears as a member of the female incarnation of the Sinister Syndicate. She quotes to Francine Frye "greetings and salutations." The Sinister Syndicate begins their mission where they attack the F.E.A.S.T. building that Boomerang is volunteering at. Beetle leads the Sinister Syndicate in attacking Boomerang. After getting Aunt May to safety, Peter Parker changes into Spider-Man and helps Boomerang fight the Syndicate. The Syndicate starts doing their formation attack until Spider-Man accidentally sets off Boomerang's gaserang which knocks out Spider-Man enough for the Syndicate to make off with Boomerang. When Beetle returns to the headquarters, White Rabbit is present when Mayor Wilson Fisk brings the full force of New York City to their headquarters demanding that they surrender Boomerang to him. The Syndicate then assists Spider-Man against Mayor Fisk's forces. After Spider-Man evacuates Boomerang, the Syndicate fights Mayor Fisk's forces while not killing them. The Syndicate is defeated and arrested by the police. Their transport is then attacked by an unknown assailant who frees them.

Abilities and equipment
The White Rabbit has no superhuman abilities but is well-educated (at least a Bachelor of Arts degree in Literature or its equivalent) and knows some martial arts. The White Rabbit is obsessed with the works of Lewis Carroll, and her equipment reflects her obsession, with her weaponry including an umbrella that shoots razor-sharp or explosive carrots, a large, rideable, heavily armed robot rabbit, genetically-engineered killer bunnies and jet-boots. She also has two custom-modified vehicles: a zeppelin called the Flying Hare, and a van called the Bunnymobile.

Due to her unconventional appearance, insanity, lack of judgement and bad reputation, few people take her seriously, and she is generally dismissed as a raving lunatic.

Reception

Accolades 

 In 2020, CBR.com ranked the White Rabbit 6th in their "Marvel: Dark Spider-Man Villains, Ranked From Lamest To Coolest" list and 8th in their "Spider-Man: 10 Weirdest Animal Villains From The Comics That We'd Like To See In The MCU" list.
 In 2021, Screen Rant included the White Rabbit in their "Spider-Man: 10 Best Female Villains" list.
 In 2022, Screen Rant included the White Rabbit in their "10 Spider-Man Villains That Are Smarter Than They Seem" list.
 In 2022, CBR.com ranked the White Rabbit 9th in their "Spider-Man's 10 Funniest Villains" list.

Other versions

Marvel Adventures
 White Rabbit appears in the Marvel Adventures Spider-Man series. She is romantically interested in Venom, and she even writes to him when he is in the Vault. White Rabbit plans a series of Lewis Carroll-inspired robberies alongside Venom, while he pretends to be Spider-Man's new unwanted sidekick. However, Spider-Man figures out the plan and defeats Venom and White Rabbit.

References

External links
 White Rabbit at Marvel.com
 White Rabbit at Marvel Wiki
 White Rabbit at Comic Vine
 
 White Rabbit's profile at SpiderFan.org

Characters created by J. M. DeMatteis
Comics characters introduced in 1983
Fictional female businesspeople
Fictional mariticides
Marvel Comics female supervillains
Marvel Comics martial artists
Spider-Man characters